The 2018–19 season was Manchester City's 117th season of competitive football, 90th season in the top flight of English football and 22nd season in the Premier League. In addition to the league, the club competed in the UEFA Champions League, FA Cup, EFL Cup, and FA Community Shield; for the Champions League, it was their eighth consecutive season competing in the tournament. The season covered the period from 1 July 2018 to 30 June 2019.

During this season, City completed a domestic treble. Apart from winning all three of the major English football tournaments, they also won the Community Shield, the first time any team has ever held all four of England's primary football trophies at the same time. The season was the first since 2009–10 without Yaya Touré, who departed to Olympiacos, and the first since 2005–06 without Joe Hart, who joined Burnley after two seasons of loans.

Season summary
In the 2018–19 season, Manchester City maintained their free scoring form under manager Pep Guardiola and became the first club in Europe's top leagues to pass 100 goals scored on 20 January 2019 when Danilo scored the first goal in City's 3–0 victory at Huddersfield Town.

City went on to break their own record for a top flight English club for goals scored in all competitions in a season. Leroy Sané's goal in City's 2–0 win at Old Trafford against Manchester United on 24 April 2019 overtook the previous record tally of 156, which was established by Manuel Pellegrini's City side back in their title-winning 2013–14 season. By the end of the 2018–19 season, the team reached 169 goals scored.

On 24 February, City won their sixth League Cup title when they defeated Chelsea 4–3 on penalties after a goalless draw over 120 minutes at Wembley Stadium.

Expectations were high for City's UEFA Champions League campaign. The team again won their group without breaking a sweat, then routed Schalke 04 in the round of 16, winning their home match 7–0. Similar to the previous season, City were drawn against an English club in the quarter-finals, this time Tottenham Hotspur. The Blues dropped their away match 0–1, with Sergio Agüero missing a penalty. The home match was all-or-nothing for City and it proved to be one of the best matches of that season. Raheem Sterling scored in the beginning, but City quickly conceded two goals and now needed to score three to advance. The squad did exactly that, leading 4–2 with 20 minutes to play. However, Fernando Llorente's wrongly awarded handball for Spurs meant City again needed a goal. In added time, Sterling converted a pass from Agüero and the entire stadium started celebrating what seemed to be a certain victory. However, the goal was disallowed after a VAR review and the Blues were eliminated in a heartbreaking fashion.

The 2018–19 Premier League title race was one of the closest contests of the Premier League era. City and Liverpool exchanged their leads 32 times over the season, in part due to fixture rearrangements for EFL and FA Cup matches and television demands. The two title contenders jointly amassed a combined total of 195 points, which at the time was the highest combined total in English top flight history.

On 12 May, City won their final league match of the league season 4–1 away at Brighton & Hove Albion to retain the Premier League title. In doing so, they matched their own record for 32 wins over a single season. They had to win their final 14 consecutive league matches to hold off the challenge of Liverpool, who themselves ended their season with nine-straight wins.

One week later, on 18 May, City defeated Watford 6–0 at Wembley to win the FA Cup and complete an unprecedented English domestic treble and clean sweep of the major honors in English football. It was also City's first ever league and FA Cup double and their sixth overall FA Cup title. The 6–0 scoreline was also the joint largest winning margin in the history of the FA Cup Final and the largest for any final in the competition since 1903. This final win of the season was Manchester City's 50th in all competitions.

As of 9 April 2019, Manchester City had won the Carabao Cup, progressed to the final of the FA Cup, were in second place with one game in hand in the Premier League and scheduled to play Tottenham in the Champions League quarter-finals, thus making it possible to achieve the quadruple, a unique sweep of four major tournaments in a single season, something that had not been done by any English side. A win in each of City’s last twelve games of the season (potential UCL semi-finals and final included) would have guaranteed the quadruple for the club. However, a dramatic loss to Tottenham on away goals on 17 April ended City's quadruple hopes. Still, the Blues managed to achieve an unprecedented domestic treble.

Pre-season and friendlies

Manchester City began their 2018–19 campaign with a tour of the United States in the 2018 International Champions Cup. City played against Borussia Dortmund at Soldier Field in Chicago, Liverpool at MetLife Stadium in East Rutherford, New Jersey, and Bayern Munich at Hard Rock Stadium in Miami Gardens, Florida.

International Champions Cup

Competitions

Overview

{| class="wikitable" style="text-align: center"
|-
!rowspan=2|Competition
!colspan=8|Record
|-
!
!
!
!
!
!
!
!
|-
| FA Community Shield

|-
| Premier League

|-
| FA Cup

|-
| EFL Cup

|-
| UEFA Champions League

|-
! Total

FA Community Shield

As champions of the 2017–18 Premier League, Manchester City took on the 2017–18 FA Cup winners, Chelsea, for the season-opening FA Community Shield.

Premier League

Manchester City entered the competition as the defending champions.

League table

Results summary

Results by matchday

Fixtures
The Premier League fixtures for the 2018–19 season were announced on 14 June 2018.

FA Cup

Manchester City entered the competition in the third round and were given a home tie against Rotherham United. The fourth round draw was made live on BBC by Robbie Keane and Carl Ikeme from Wolverhampton on 7 January 2019. The fifth round draw was broadcast live on BBC on 28 January 2019, with Alex Scott and Ian Wright conducting the draw. The quarter-finals draw was made on 18 February by Darren Fletcher & Wayne Bridge.

EFL Cup

Manchester City entered the competition in the third round as the defending champions and were drawn away to Oxford United. A home tie against Fulham was confirmed for the fourth round. The semi-finals draw was made live on Sky Sports by Piers Morgan and Peter Crouch on 19 December 2018. City advanced to the final and won, defending the title by defeating Chelsea on penalties after a goalless draw over the 120 minutes.

UEFA Champions League

On 30 August, Manchester City were drawn in Group F of the UEFA Champions League alongside Shakhtar Donetsk, Lyon and 1899 Hoffenheim.

Group stage

Knockout phase

On 17 December 2018, the round of 16 draw was made in Nyon, Switzerland.

Round of 16

Quarter-finals
The draw for the quarter-finals was held on 15 March 2019, 12:00 CET, at the UEFA headquarters in Nyon, Switzerland.

Squad information

First-team squad

Ordered by squad number.Appearances include league and cup appearances, including as substitute.Age stated as at the end of 2018–19 season.

Statistics

Squad statistics

Appearances (Apps) numbers are for appearances in competitive games only, including sub appearances.
Red card numbers denote: numbers in parentheses represent red cards overturned for wrongful dismissal.

Goalscorers
Includes all competitive matches. The list is sorted alphabetically by surname when total goals are equal.

Hat-tricks

(H) – Home ; (A) – Away; (N) – Neutral4 – Player scored four goals

Clean sheets
The list is sorted by shirt number when total clean sheets are equal. Numbers in parentheses represent games where both goalkeepers participated and both kept a clean sheet; the number in parentheses is awarded to the goalkeeper who was substituted on, whilst a full clean sheet is awarded to the goalkeeper who was on the field at the start of play.

Awards

Etihad Player of the Month

Premier League Manager of the Month

Premier League Player of the Month

Alan Hardaker Trophy
Awarded to the player of the match in the EFL Cup final.

PFA Team of the Year

PFA Young Player of the Year

FWA Player of the Year

Premier League Manager of the Season

Etihad Player of the Season
Manchester City's player of the season.

Transfers and loans

Transfers in

Transfers out

Loans out

Overall transfer activity

Expenditure

Summer:  £63,300,000

Winter:  £420,000

Total:  £63,720,000

Income

Summer:  £43,550,000

Winter:  £26,500,000

Total:  £70,050,000

Net totals

Summer:  £19,750,000

Winter:  £26,080,000

Total:  £6,330,000

References

External links

Manchester City F.C. seasons
Manchester City
Manchester City
English football championship-winning seasons